Al Mulla Group is a diversified privately held business group based in the State of Kuwait with operations in 8 countries.  With over 15,000 employees working in more than 40+ companies, Al Mulla Group today has affiliations with over 200 leading international brands and companies. The Group's operations include automotive and heavy equipment distribution and servicing, electro-mechanical contracting, civil construction, power,  manufacturing, consumer & corporate financing, investments, insurance, healthcare, education, real estate, office automation, and industrial product distribution, rental and leasing of vehicles and heavy equipment, and money exchange services.

History
Established in 1938 by then Secretary of State Abdullah Saleh Al Mulla, the Group started out when the late Mr. Al Mulla set up an electrical and domestic appliance store, soon acquiring the GEC franchise from the United Kingdom. In 1947, the Bader Al Mulla and Brothers Company was created and later acquired the rights to distribute Chrysler Middle East, Plymouth and Dodge Middle East vehicles in Kuwait. Expansion followed into areas of marine products, HVAC contracting, travel and industrial equipment distribution.

Starting in 2003, the Group expanded into several new areas which today are leaders in each of their fields.  These include the money exchange, healthcare and education sectors, while the other core areas of Automotive and Engineering continued to grow significantly in size and market share.

In 2018, Daimler AG, the owner of the Mercedes-Benz brand, selected Al Mulla Group as its new sole distributor in Kuwait for both Passenger Cars as well as Trucks and Buses. Al Mulla Group, through its fully owned subsidiary Al Mulla Automobiles Co., opened the first Mercedes-Benz showroom in Kuwait in January 2019.  

In December 2019, Al Mulla Group sealed a deal with XCMG, the largest manufacturer of construction machinery in China, to be its sole distributor in Kuwait.

Business Divisions 

 Automotive                                  
 Engineering
 Financial Services 
 Trading & Manufacturing
 Rental & Leasing
 Education
 Healthcare
 Real Estate

History 
Following the founder's death in 1955, his eldest son Bader became chairman until 1969, with his brothers Najeeb and Anwar becoming his successors; Najeeb as Chairman, and Anwar as Deputy Chairman & CEO. Three years later, the Maseelah Trading Company was founded in 1972.  Maseelah Trading acquired the distribution rights for Mitsubishi Motor Vehicles in Kuwait,  leading to dramatic growth in the group's automotive business.

In 1978, radical changes were made to the company: A multinational board was appointed, instead of a board of only family members.  The Group entered additional businesses such as environmental systems, vehicle rental and leasing, fire protection, office equipment, security services, engineering products, consumer appliances and insurance consultancy.  Presently, the group operates through 40+ subsidiaries and affiliates under the umbrella of Al Mulla Group Holding Company.

Subsidiaries/Associates/Affiliates/Investments

References

1938 establishments in Kuwait
Conglomerate companies established in 1938
Companies of Kuwait
Holding companies established in 1938
Real estate companies established in 1938
Financial services companies established in 1938